Nguyễn Thị Vạn (born 10 January 1997) is a Vietnamese footballer who plays as a midfielder for Women's Championship club Than Khoáng Sản and the Vietnam women's national team.

International goals
.Scores and results are list Vietnam's goal tally first.

References

1997 births
Living people
Women's association football midfielders
Vietnamese women's footballers
Vietnam women's international footballers
Asian Games competitors for Vietnam
Footballers at the 2018 Asian Games
Southeast Asian Games gold medalists for Vietnam
Southeast Asian Games medalists in football
Competitors at the 2017 Southeast Asian Games
21st-century Vietnamese women